The Bukid language, Binukid or Bukidnon, is an Austronesian language spoken by indigenous peoples of Northern Mindanao in the southern Philippines. The word  means 'mountain' or 'highland' while  means 'in the manner, or style, of the mountain or highland'.

Distribution and dialects 
Binukid is spoken in the north of the island Mindanao in southern Philippines; it is spoken in the following areas:

central and northern Bukidnon Province
northeastern Lanao del Norte Province
Misamis Oriental Province: Cagayan de Oro area including southwest of Gingoog Bay
very small border strip of Lanao del Sur

Binukid has many dialects, but there is mutual intelligibility. The dialect of Malaybalay, in the Pulangi area, is considered to be the prestige and standard variety.

Phonology 
Binukid consists of twenty segmental phonemes and one suprasegmental phoneme. The syllable is the basic unit of word structure, and each syllable consists of one vowel and one or two consonants only, arranged in the following patterns: CV, CVC and, in some instances, CCV (which is found mostly in Spanish loanwords). A word consists of one or more of these syllables.

Consonants 
There are 16 consonants in Binukid. In some instances, there is a voiceless alveolo-palatal affricate  which appears in Spanish loanwords.

The phoneme  is sometimes trilled which is used in intervocalic position or in Spanish loanwords by some speakers. All consonants except  are found in initial and final position in the syllable;  is found only syllable-initial.

Vowels 
There are generally four vowels in Binukid.

Suprasegmentals 
There is a suprasegmental phoneme of stress which usually falls on the penultimate syllable. Stress give contrast to words of the same segmental phonemes; for example   means 'surprise' while   means 'drunk'. Long words may have more than one stress:   'rooster'. Stress commonly shifts when suffixes are added to the word (as in  'mysterious') or when the speaker wishes to emphasize the word.

Grammar

Pronouns 
The following set of pronouns are the pronouns found in the Bukid language. The -final allomorphs of the vowel-final NOM or GEN pronouns are used almost exclusively before  ('already'), a bound adverbial.

Writing system and orthography 
The Latin script is used in writing the language. Word-initial and word-final glottal stops are not written but glottal stops following a consonant is marked by a hyphen. Example:   'mildew'. The phoneme  is represented by a digraph , which is sometimes considered a separate letter.

Other letters, such as c, f, j, q, and z, are used in proper nouns or loanwords that have not had their spellings altered.

Suprasegmental phonemes and glottalization are featured in writing Binukid. Stress can be indicated by an acute accent . A grave accent  can be marked over syllable- or word-final vowel to indicate a following glottal stop. If stress is shown on the final letter and there is a following glottal stop, a circumflex accent  can be used. There is no marking for words whose stress falls on the penultimate syllable and without a secondary stress.

Examples:
   'living room'
   'small cut'
   'sin'
   'to wipe'
   'shrub'
   'rooster'
   'lizard'

The plural particle marker  is written , following accepted Philippine usage.

Notes

References

 
 
 

Manobo languages
Languages of Bukidnon